ILAUD (or I.L.A. & U.D. International Laboratory of Architecture and Urban Design) is the acronym for International Laboratory of Architecture and Urban Design. Founded by Giancarlo De Carlo in 1976 on the same concepts that led to the founding of Team X. The laboratory in 27 years of existence has accepted some of the most prestigious international architects, often personal friends and colleagues of the director Giancarlo De Carlo (among others Alison and Peter Smithson, Sverre Fehn, and Renzo Piano). Bringing students from around the world to think and design in Italy. The ILAUD took place in a systematic way each year during the summertime in some of the most picturesque Italian city such as Venice, Siena and Urbino. While in the Tuscan city, the ILAUD participants studied the recovery of the Santa Maria della Scala in Siena.
In Venice many projects were made concerning the city itself and its surrounding. None of them were actually realised nor considered by the city Administration, although there were public exhibitions held.

Has produced numerous publications as a result of proposals made by the host city.

ILAUD Alumni
(incomplete list)

Stig-Gunne Bengtsson 
Oscar Carracedo García-Villalba 
Greg Albertson 
Andreu Arriola 
Isabel Bachs 
Carl Bäckstrand 
Elisabeth Andersson 
Josep Maria Birulès Bertràn 
Per Erik Bjornsen 
Angelo Bonanni 
Patrizia Bruzzone 
Vincenzo Casali 
Toni Casamor 
Emanuela Casati 
Marco Ceccaroni 
Simona Cirio 
Mario Cucinella 
Simonetta Daffarra 
Giacomo Delbene 
Johs Ensby 
Jaime J. Ferrer Forés 
Carme Fiol
Giovanna Franco 
Arturo Frediani 
Olga Gambardella 
Lars Gezelius 
Marco Guarino 
Laura Carrara-Cagni 
William Gilchrist 
Ingermarie Holmebakk 
Ross Ishikawa 
Lisa Joyce 
Dag Krogh 
Duccio Malagamba 
Maria Rita Menicucci 
Enric Miralles 
Juan Monsanto 
Mauro Moriconi 
Maria Cristina Munari 
Elizabeth Newman 
Pascale Pieters 
Henrietta Palmer 
Mathias Persson 
Carme Pinos 
Alessandro Quartieri 
Francesco Rosadini 
Viola Rouhani 
Tom Salvado 
Yolanda Ortega Sanz 
Peter Scupelli 
Christopher Sensenig 
Göran Skoog 
Adolf Sotoca 
Anna Laura Spalla 
Sabina Tattara 
Clelia Tuscano 
Carlos Velilla 
Stan Vistica 
Vidar Vollan 
Laure Waast 
Lars Westerberg 
Michela Zaniboni 
José Manuel de la Puente Martorell 
Elisabetta Parodi Dandini 
Roberto Silvestri 
Elisenda Tortajada

Siena,  - 1988

Lars Westerberg 
Erik von Matern 
Nicolas Goubau 

Venice,  - 2001

Martine De Flander 

Venice,  - 2002

Silvia Bodei 
Manuel Cordero Alvarado 
Salvador Davila 
Athina Katsanou 
Lorenzo Mattozzi 
Pietro Peyron 
Carles Serrano Blanco 
Davide Servente 
Ulrika Staugaard 
Roger Such 
Laura Suñen 
José Manuel Toral 
Carolina Cajide 
Emanuele Varone 

Venice,  - 2003

Jacob Antherton 
Aimee Chan 
Chiara Desiderio 
Susanna Douglas 
Fabio Gleria 
Laura Masiero 
Tommaso Trivellato

Participant Professors/Architects
(incomplete list)

Oscar Carracedo García-Villalba 
Andreu Arriola 
Carme Fiol 
Alberto Cecchetto 
Francesco Calzolaio 
Ignasi de Sola-Morales 
Balkrishna Doshi
Russ Ellis
Sverre Fehn 
Aquiles González Raventós 
Jaime J. Ferrer Forés 
Per Olaf Fjeld 
Donlyn Lindon
Franco Mancuso
Enric Massip-Bosch 
John McKean 
Thomas McQuillan
Carles Muro 
Bernt Nilsson
Connie Occhialini 
Renzo Piano
Daniele Pini
Bruno Queysanne
Francesco Samassa
Adolf Sotoca 
Peter Smithson 
Ezequiel Usón 
Jan Wampler
Francesco Gostoli 
Lode Janssens 
Giorgio Bianchi 
Donald Hart 
Giorgio Bagnasco 
Emmi Serra 
Willy Serneels 
José Manuel de la Puente 
Jill Stoner

Staff
(incomplete list)
Cristina Pucci 
Stefano Tormene 
Toni Garbasso

External links
 ILA&UD - Official site
 ILA&UD - Attemptive design
ILA&UD - Workshop paper by Lorenzo Mattozzi, 2002

Architecture schools